Renfield is an upcoming American comedy horror film directed by Chris McKay from a screenplay by Ryan Ridley, based on an original idea by Robert Kirkman featuring characters from Bram Stoker's 1897 novel Dracula. It is a reboot of Universal Pictures' Dracula series. The film stars Nicholas Hoult as the title character, alongside Nicolas Cage as Count Dracula, with Awkwafina, Ben Schwartz, and Adrian Martinez in supporting roles.

Renfield will have its world premiere at the Overlook Film Festival on March 30, 2023, and is scheduled to be released in the United States on April 14, 2023, by Universal Pictures.

Premise
Count Dracula's lackey R. M. Renfield finds a new lease on life in modern-day New Orleans when he falls in love with Rebecca Quincy, a traffic cop.

Cast
 Nicholas Hoult as R. M. Renfield, the long-suffering servant of Dracula.
 Nicolas Cage as Vlad the Impaler / Count Dracula, a legendary vampire and Renfield's ill-tempered and narcissistic boss.
 Awkwafina as Rebecca Quincy, an aggressive traffic cop and Renfield's love-interest.
 Ben Schwartz as Teddy Lobo, a mob enforcer.
 Adrian Martinez as Chris Marcos, a traffic cop and Quincy's co-worker.
 Shohreh Aghdashloo as Ella, a mob boss.
 Bess Rous as Caitlyn, a support group member.
 James Moses Black as Captain J. Browning.
 Caroline Williams as Vanessa
 Brandon Scott Jones as Mark, a support group leader
 Miles Doleac

Production

Development 
In July 2014, Universal Pictures announced classic horror film properties, including the character of Count Dracula, as part of a unified shared universe with Alex Kurtzman and Chris Morgan attached to oversee its development. After the negative reception of Dracula Untold (2014), its connections to a unified series were downplayed, and The Mummy (2017) was re-positioned as the first film in the series. The Mummy, a critical and commercial failure, resulted in Universal's decision to shift its focus on individual storytelling and move away from the shared universe concept.

Renfield is based on an original pitch by Robert Kirkman and uses a screenplay by Ryan Ridley. In November 2019, Dexter Fletcher was hired to direct the film for Universal and Skybound Entertainment. The film was described as a comedic approach to the story of Count Dracula, in the vein of Taika Waititi's vampire mockumentary What We Do in the Shadows (2014), that focused on the character of Renfield. In 2020, Leigh Whannell's The Invisible Man became a commercial and critical success for Universal and served as a relaunch to its monster universe. In April 2021, Chris McKay entered negotiations to direct after Fletcher left to work on a reboot of The Saint for Paramount Pictures. McKay was hired because he reportedly gave a successful pitch combining the story's mix of humor and action, "something the studio was looking to have more of".

Casting 

Nicholas Hoult was cast as Renfield in August 2021. Nicolas Cage was cast to play Count Dracula in November, Awkwafina and Ben Schwartz were added to the cast in December, and Adrian Martinez, Shohreh Aghdashloo, Bess Rous, James Moses Black, Caroline Williams, and Brandon Scott Jones were confirmed to star the following year. An "enormous" fan of Dracula and the source material, Cage prepared for his role by observing the distinctive ways Dracula was portrayed on screen by Bela Lugosi, Frank Langella, and Gary Oldman. "What can I bring that will be different?", he said, "I want it to pop in a unique way. We've seen it played well, we've seen it play not so well, so what can we do? So I'm thinking to really focus on the movement of the character ... [and] that perfect tone of comedy and horror". Cage mentioned An American Werewolf in London (1981), Ring (1998), and Malignant (2021) as inspirations for the role. The film will mark Cage's first live-action film by a major studio since Ghost Rider: Spirit of Vengeance (2011).

Filming 
Filming began in New Orleans on February 3, 2022, with Mitchell Amundsen serving as cinematographer. On February 8, more than twenty vehicles belonging to the production crew were burglarized. One security guard was present at the time of the incident, which occurred late at night in a secured parking lot. Crew member Elmo Peoples said the vandals had stolen his insurance papers, two bank cards, and a laptop. He added, "I'm supposed to be here all week and I don't even want to come back because I feel like they don't really care about us as much as the main characters or actors." Love Bugs Film LLC reassured the production crew that they would hire additional security. Filming wrapped on April 14, 2022, exactly one year prior to the film's scheduled release.

Release
Renfield will premiere at the Overlook Film Festival on March 30, 2023.  It is scheduled to be released in theaters on April 14, 2023, by Universal Pictures.

References

External links
 Official Website
 

Upcoming films
2023 comedy films
2023 horror films
2023 films
2020s comedy horror films
2020s English-language films
2020s monster movies
2020s supernatural horror films
American comedy horror films
American supernatural horror films
American vampire films
Films based on multiple works
Films based on works by Bram Stoker
Films set in castles
Films set in Transylvania
Films shot in New Orleans
Reboot films
Universal Pictures films
Upcoming English-language films
Upcoming IMAX films
Vampire comedy films
Films directed by Chris McKay
Films scored by Marco Beltrami
2020s American films
IMAX films